Pyrazus is a genus of sea snails, marine gastropod mollusks in the family Batillariidae. Pyriazidae is a synonym of Batillariidae and Pyrazus is the type genus of the Pyriazidae.

Pyrazus is (incorrectly?) classified within Potamididae at WoRMS.

Species
Species within the genus Pyrazus include:

 Pyrazus eriensis (Mörch, 1876)
 Pyrazus ebeninus (Bruguière, 1792)
 † Pyrazus pentagonatus (Schlotheim, 1820) - from Eocene of Hungary

References

External links

Batillariidae
Extant Eocene first appearances